Lina Ng Su Fang (born 6 May 1974) is a Singaporean actress and host. She was a full-time Mediacorp and SPH MediaWorks artiste from 1993 to 2004 but currently continues to film on an ad-hoc basis.

One of the most acclaimed actresses in Singapore, Ng is the first and only actress to win an Asian Academy Creative Award and an Asian Television Award in Singapore. In 2021, Ng received the Asian Television Award for Best Supporting Actress for her role as a majie in the English-language series Last Madame.She also runs Mustard Seeds Academy, which provides Chinese enrichment classes to childcare centres.

Career 
Ng entered the entertainment industry after finishing 1st runner-up in the local talent-search competition Star Search 1993. Other contestants included Ann Kok and Ivy Lee, whom the former later revealed in 2009 that Ng was "openly competitive" during the competition. Ng later joined SPH MediaWorks, and left full-time acting following SPH Mediaworks' merger with MediaCorp. Since then, she has appeared in a number of productions including the 2012 series Joys of Life.

Ng was nominated for Top 10 Most Popular Female Artistes from 1995 to 1998.

In 2017, Ng appeared in Have A Little Faith where she played an abusive mother. Shortly after, she played another supporting role in My Teacher Is a Thug. She went on to play the leading role in Channel 5 series Lion Mums 2.

In 2018, she was cast in a Toggle original drama series Close Your Eyes.

Personal life 
Ng married Mike Lam, a Physical Education teacher, on 9 September 2004 and they have three sons. She taught for three years in a pre-school before running a Mandarin enrichment company with former actress Evelyn Tan.

Filmography

Television

Film

Awards and nominations

References

External links 
 

Living people
20th-century Singaporean actresses
21st-century Singaporean actresses
Singaporean television actresses
Singaporean television personalities
Singaporean film actresses
Singaporean people of Teochew descent
1974 births